Below are the results of the 2007 Biathlon World Championships 2007 for the men's relay, which took place on 10 February 2007.

Results

References 

Men's Relay